Chicago Board of Trade III is a color photograph made by German artist Andreas Gursky in 1999–2009. It is the third version of the original picture, previously titled Chicago Board of Trade (1997) and Chicago Board of Trade II (1999). The artist used the same previous process of manipulating the images by computer before achieving the final result.

The picture has the large format of 201 by 285 cm, as its usual with the author's photographs. This final version shows the space of the board of trade in a more clear way than the previous picture of the series, depicting the turmoil of the brokers in a usual working day.

This version of the picture was sold by $3,298,755 at Sotheby's, London, on 26 June 2013. This represented a 169% increase over the estimate price of $1,200,000.

See also
 List of most expensive photographs

References

Color photographs
1999 in art
1990s photographs
2009 in art
2000s photographs
Photographs by Andreas Gursky